Carol Moldaw (born 1956) is an American poet, novelist and critic. Her book The Lightning Field won the FIELD Poetry Prize.

Biography
Carol Moldaw was born in Oakland, California and grew up in the San Francisco Bay Area. Moldaw holds an A.B. from Harvard University and an M.A. from Boston University.

She is the author of six books of poetry: Beauty Refracted; So Late, So Soon: New and Selected Poems; The Lightning Field, which won the FIELD Poetry Prize; Through the Window; Chalkmarks on Stone; and Taken from the River. She is also author of the novel The Widening. A forthcoming book of poems, Beauty, Refracted, was published in 2018 by Four Way Books.

Noted for their deep intelligence and lushness of language, Moldaw's poems have been published widely. Her work has appeared in AGNI, Denver Quarterly, FIELD, The New Republic, The New Yorker, The Paris Review, Parnassus, The Threepenny Review, Triquarterly, and a number of other well-known journals and magazines.

Frieda Gardner wrote in The Women's Review of Books, "[Moldaw] courts revelation . . . in a voice variously curious, passionate, surprised, meditative, and sensual. On the surface of her work are rich sounds and varitations of rhythm and line. A few steps deeper in lie wells of feeling and complexities of thought." A review in The New Yorker of Chalkmarks on Stone noted her work "repeatedly achieves lyric junctures of shivering beauty," calling Moldaw's poems "oblique, wily, and intensely intelligent." D. Nurkse called Moldaw “a treasured poet, a master of lyric intensity," observing her work as "a fascinating act of exploration." “Here are poems of intelligent consideration and a deft and heart-born music," wrote acclaimed poet Jane Hirshfield, "filled with the gleam of particularity and a lushness of language and substance.”

Moldaw’s prose has also been published in numerous journals and magazines including AGNI, The Antioch Review, The Boston Review, Broad Street, FIELD, The Massachusetts Review, Partisan Review' and Plume. Her poems have been anthologized in Western Wind: An Introduction to Poetry (McGraw-Hill) and Under 35: A New Generation of American Poets (Anchor), and her work has been translated into Chinese, Portuguese and Turkish.

Moldaw is the recipient of several literary distinctions including an NEA Creative Writing Fellowship, a Pushcart Prize and a Lannan Foundation Marfa Writer’s Residency.

While never a full-time academic, Moldaw has taught creative writing in a number of programs across the US, including the Stonecoast MFA Program in Creative Writing and the creative writing program at the College of Santa Fe (now Santa Fe University of Art and Design). She was a Visiting Writer at Bucknell University's Stadler Center for Poetry and the Louis D. Rubin, Jr., Writer-in-Residence at Hollins University. Moldaw has taught workshops at the Taos Summer Writers' Conference, Vermont Studio Center and Naropa University.

She lives in Santa Fe, New Mexico with her husband, Arthur Sze, and their daughter.

Books

Poetry

Taken from the River, Alef Books (New York, NY), 1993.
Challkmarks on Stone, La Alameda Press (Albuquerque, NM), 1998.
Through the Window, La Alameda Press (Albuquerque, NM), 2001.
The Lightning Field, Oberlin College Press (Oberlin, OH), 2003.
So Late, So Soon: New and Selected Poems, Etruscan Press (Wilkes-Barre, PA), 2010.
Beauty, Refracted, Four Way Books (New York, NY), 2018.

Fiction

 The Widening, Etruscan Press (Wilkes-Barre, PA), 2008.

Honors & awards
 Lannan Foundation Marfa Writers Residency, 2006.
 The FIELD Poetry Prize, 2002.
 Pushcart Poetry Prize, 2002.
 National Endowment for the Arts Creative Writing Fellowship in Poetry,1994.

References

External links

Website 
carolmoldaw.com

Articles and Interviews 
 "Then. And Since Then," Jon Davis, Santa Fe Reporter, April 15, 2014 
 "Bad Girls: An Interview with Carol Moldaw and Abigail DeWitt," VIDA: Women in Literary Arts January 9, 2013 
 "An Interview With Carol Moldaw," Sou'wester Magazine, Spring 2009
 "Carol Moldaw reads Gjertrud Schnackenberg" Lemon Hound, October 17, 2008

Selected writings
"Lou Reed in Istanbul" 
"Pelagos" 
"64 Panoramic Way" 
Excerpt from The Widening 
Three poems 
From Through the Window 
"A Sheaf of Studies in Pen and Ink" 
Poetry Daily Pick, on Robert Frost's "To Earthward" Picks 2010/Carol_Moldaw.html
"The Bottom Line" (Essay) 
Molossus: World Poetry Portfolio #9 

Living people
1956 births
University of Southern Maine faculty
Boston University alumni
Harvard University alumni
21st-century American novelists
American women poets
American women novelists
21st-century American women writers
21st-century American poets
Novelists from Maine
American women academics